Patricia Clement Babbitt is a Professor and Principal Investigator (PI) in the school of pharmacy at the University of California, San Francisco (UCSF).

Education
Patricia Babbitt earned a PhD in pharmaceutical chemistry in 1988 from the University of California, San Francisco for research supervised by George L. Kenyon and Irwin Kuntz.

Career and research

Babbitt serves as the director of the UCSF bioinformatics and medical informatics graduate program. She also serves on the advisory boards for the UniProt, InterPro and MetaCyc databases, the Howard Hughes Medical Institute (HHMI) scientific review board, and as a deputy editor for PLOS Computational Biology. Her research interests include bioinformatics and computational biology.

Awards and honors
Babbitt was elected a Fellow of the  International Society for Computational Biology (ISCB) in 2018 for “outstanding contributions to the fields of computational biology and bioinformatics”.

References

Living people
American bioinformaticians
Year of birth missing (living people)
University of California, San Francisco faculty